Greystones railway station is a railway station in Greystones, County Wicklow, Ireland. It is the southern terminus of the DART electrified rail network.

Facilities and services 
The station has two platforms; platform 1 on the west side of the station (where the station building is located) and platform 2 over the footbridge on the east side of the station. Platform 2 is used only a few times a day, when DART and InterCity services are in the station at the same time. There are also sidings to the east of the station.

Entrance to the station building is only possible from Church Road. The station houses one retail unit, currently occupied by a café (previously an estate agent), a ticket office and two electronic ticket machines. Toilets are also available on Platform 1. The ticket office is open between 07:00 -10:00 AM, Monday to Friday.

DART services serve the station, as do all South Eastern Commuter (Dublin Connolly to Gorey) and Intercity (Dublin Connolly to Rosslare Europort) services.

The typical service from the station (Monday to Friday off-peak) is:

2 trains per hour to Howth or Malahide via Bray Daly and Dublin Connolly
4 trains per day to Rosslare Europort via Arklow
1 train per day to Wexford O'Hanrahan via Arklow
4 trains per day to Dublin Connolly via Bray Daly (services from south of Greystones)
1 train per day to Dundalk.

2 trains per hour also terminate at the station.

History
The station was opened on 30 October 1855 by the Dublin, Wicklow and Wexford Railway as Greystones & Delgany. It was later renamed Greystones in 1863.

Construction of the electrification and extension of the DART services to Greystones began in 1995 and was completed in 1999. The DART service to Greystones commenced on 10 April 2000.

Bus services 
There are two bus stops directly outside the station on Church Road, one for northbound routes and the other for southbound. Operators serving the station include Dublin Bus, Go-Ahead Ireland, Aircoach and the Finnegan Bray Night Bus. There is also a taxi rank near the station.

See also
 List of railway stations in Ireland

References

External links

Irish Rail Greystones Station Website

Iarnród Éireann stations in County Wicklow
Railway stations in County Wicklow
Railway stations opened in 1855
Greystones
1855 establishments in Ireland
Railway stations in the Republic of Ireland opened in the 19th century